"Highs & Lows" is a song by Scottish singer Emeli Sandé, recorded for her second studio album Long Live the Angels (2016).  It was written by Sandé along with Tom Barnes, Peter Kelleher, Ben Kohn, and Wayne Hector and produced by Barnes, Kelleher, and Kohn under their production moniker TMS. The song was released as the album's third and final single on 7 March 2017.

Music video
An accompanying music video for "Highs & Lows" was released in 31 January 2017. It was directed by Charles Mehling, who also directed the album's previous videos, and depicts Sandé performing among friends.

Track listings

Credits and personnel 
Credits adapted from the liner notes of Long Live the Angels.

 Tom Barnes – programming
 Kevin Davis – mixing
 Pete Kelleher – synth
 Sam Klempner – recording
 Ben Kohn – guitar

 Jodi Milliner – bass
 Robbie Nelson – recording
 Gavin Powell – organ, piano
 Emeli Sandé – vocals, writing
 Leo Taylor – drums

Charts

References

2016 songs
2017 singles
Emeli Sandé songs
Songs written by Emeli Sandé
Virgin Records singles